The BMW Championship is a professional golf tournament which is the penultimate FedEx Cup playoff event on the PGA Tour schedule. Introduced in 2007, the BMW Championship was previously known as the Western Open.  The Western Golf Association, which founded and ran the Western Open, runs the BMW Championship. In 2012, 2013, and 2014, the PGA Tour named the BMW Championship its Tournament of the Year. The BMW Championship is the longest running regular PGA Tour event on the calendar outside of the four major tournaments.

Tournament format

The BMW Championship is open to the top 70 PGA Tour golfers following the FedEx St. Jude Championship. With only seventy players in the field, there is no 36-hole cut. FedEx Cup points amassed during the regular PGA Tour season and then during The Northern Trust determine the participants. The top 30 FedEx Cup points leaders following the BMW Championship advance to final playoff event, The Tour Championship, where the FedEx Cup Champion will be determined.

The BMW Championship was primarily held at Cog Hill Golf & Country Club in Lemont, Illinois, southwest of Chicago. In 2008, it was held in Missouri at Bellerive Country Club in Town and Country, a suburb west of St. Louis. In 2012, the Ryder Cup was contested at nearby Medinah Country Club, and the championship was moved to Indiana at Crooked Stick Golf Club in Carmel, north of Indianapolis. It was contested in Colorado in 2014 at Cherry Hills Country Club in Cherry Hills Village, a suburb south of Denver.

The 2015 BMW Championship was played at the Conway Farms Golf Club in Lake Forest, Illinois; Jason Day scored a personal record of 61 (−10) during the first round and won the event with a score of −22. The 2016 edition returned to Crooked Stick near Indianapolis, where Dustin Johnson won with a score of −23. Aussie Marc Leishman cruised to victory at the 2017 BMW Championship at Conway Farms Golf Club in Lake Forest, Illinois.

Western Open
 For a detailed history of this event, including a list of its champions, see Western Open.

The Western Open was first played  in 1899. For many years, the Western was played in and out of the state of Illinois, before eventually settling down in the Chicago area. The Western Golf Association (WGA) ran the Western Open throughout its entire history (1899–2006), and continues to run the tournament under its new title. These are, however, two entirely different events in terms of playing format and invitational criteria. The Western Open was like any other regular PGA Tour stop – although it was once considered to be one of golf's majors. The BMW Championship is part of the FedEx Cup Playoffs, and only the top 70 FedEx Cup points leaders at the start of the BMW event will be eligible to play.

Winners

Future sites

Source:

References

External links

Coverage on the PGA Tour's official site
Official site of the Western Golf Association

PGA Tour events
FedEx Cup
Golf in Illinois
Golf in Indiana
Golf in Missouri
Golf in Colorado
Golf in Delaware
Sports competitions in Indianapolis
Sports in St. Louis
Lemont, Illinois
Carmel, Indiana
Wilmington, Delaware
BMW
Annual sporting events in the United States